Baykal is a village in Balyklykulsky Selsoviet, Aurgazinsky District of the Republic of Bashkortostan, Russia.

References

Rural localities in Aurgazinsky District